I Don't Want to Talk About It is a 1993 Argentine-Italian drama film directed by María Luisa Bemberg, starring Luisina Brando and Marcello Mastroianni. This film was shot in the historic quarter of Colonia del Sacramento, Uruguay. The script was based on a short story by Julio Llinas.

Cast
 Marcello Mastroianni - Ludovico D'Andrea
 Luisina Brando - Leonor
 Alejandra Podesta - Charlotte
 Betiana Blum - Madama
 Roberto Carnaghi - Father Aurelio
 Alberto Segado - Dr. Blanes
 Mónica Lacoste - Sra. Blanes
 Jorge Luz - Lord Mayor
 Mónica Villa - Mrs. Zamudio
 Juan Manuel Tenuta - Police Chief
 Tina Serrano - Widow Schmidt
 Verónica Llinás - Myrna
 Susana Cortínez - Sra Peralta
 Martin Kalwill - Mayor's Clerk
 Walter Marín - Mojame

See also

List of films featuring the deaf and hard of hearing

References

External links

1993 films
Argentine drama films
Italian drama films
1990s Spanish-language films
1993 drama films
Films directed by María Luisa Bemberg
Films scored by Nicola Piovani
Films shot in Colonia del Sacramento
Films about people with dwarfism
1990s Italian films
1990s Argentine films